Baldassare Di Maggio (San Giuseppe Jato, November 19, 1954), also known as Balduccio, was a member of the Mafia, who became a government witness (pentito - repentant). He helped the police to capture the head of Cosa Nostra, Totò Riina, and claimed that Riina respectfully kissed three-time prime minister Giulio Andreotti when they met in 1987.

Mafioso
Di Maggio was born in San Giuseppe Jato, a town in the province of Palermo and was initiated in 1981 in the local Mafia family, headed by Bernardo Brusca. He was involved in the elimination of Rosario Riccobono and 14 other men of Riccobono's Mafia clan in November 1982 during the Second Mafia War. In 2001, he received an 11 year prison sentence, which took into account his testimonies as government witness.

When the capo-famiglia of San Giuseppe Jato, Bernardo Brusca, a member of the Sicilian Mafia Commission went to prison and his son Giovanni Brusca was banished to Linosa, Di Maggio became acting head of the family. However, when Giovanni Brusca returned in 1990, Di Maggio became an uncomfortable presence who needed to be eliminated. A peace meeting was convened by Riina, but Di Maggio did not trust the set-up, and fled from Sicily for his life.

Capture of Riina
Di Maggio was arrested on January 8, 1993, in the northern town of Borgomanero, near Novara, for illegal possession of a pistol. He immediately admitted that he was a man of honour and told the police that he could help them find Totò Riina. Di Maggio was typical of the new generation of mafiosi who had become disillusioned with the domination of the Corleonesi. He had risen within the organisation by committing countless murders for Riina and for the Mafia of San Giuseppe Jato.

Di Maggio, a former driver for Riina, was brought to Palermo to help a special team of the Carabinieri to locate Riina and dismantle the protective structure that the boss had created. Riina was arrested on January 15, 1993. Some, including Giovanni Brusca, claim that Di Maggio's lead was a cover for the fact that the perennial fugitive Bernardo Provenzano had betrayed his former associate Riina.

Di Maggio also gave investigators important links about the killing of Antimafia judge Giovanni Falcone.

The "kiss of honour"
Di Maggio claimed to have been present at a Mafia meeting with Giulio Andreotti where Totò Riina allegedly greeted the former Prime Minister with a "kiss of honour". He said in testimony to Palermo prosecutors, "I am absolutely certain that I recognized Giulio Andreotti because I saw him many times on television. I interpreted the kiss that Andreotti and Salvatore Riina exchanged as a sign of respect."

According to Di Maggio, the incident happened in September 1987 at the Palermo home of Ignazio Salvo, a high-ranking associate of Andreotti who was accused by informers of being one of the politician's main contacts with Cosa Nostra. "When we walked in, the people present were the Hon. Giulio Andreotti and the Hon. Salvo Lima", Di Maggio said. "They stood up and I shook their hand and kissed Ignazio Salvo. Riina, however, greeted with a kiss all three people."

Andreotti dismissed the charges against him as "lies and slander ... the kiss of Riina, mafia summits ... scenes out of a comic horror film." Veteran journalist Indro Montanelli doubted the claim, saying Andreotti "doesn't even kiss his own children." Di Maggio's credibility had been shaken in the closing weeks of the Andreotti trial when he admitted killing a man while under state protection. 
Appeal court judges rejected Di Maggio's testimony about the kiss of respect.

Vendetta
Di Maggio, while in the witness protection programme, moved back to his hometown in 1995 and started a vendetta against his enemy Giovanni Brusca in the San Giuseppe Jato, Altofonte and San Cipirello  area in co-operation with other pentiti such as Santino Di Matteo and Gioacchino La Barbera. Although key witnesses in several important trials were under way, they recommenced their criminal activities and avenge atrocities by the Bruscas carried out on their family members. On October 14, 1997, Di Maggio was rearrested. 

Di Maggio claimed he was encouraged by investigators to chase and help capture Brusca. The affair created a scandal in Italy and damaged the government witness programme and the trial against Andreotti. Di Maggio, who had received a US$300,000 'bonus' under the witness-protection program, had his benefits stripped away. In April 2002, Di Maggio received a life sentence for the killings he committed while being in the witness protection programme.

Mafia and politics
Di Maggio made several declarations on the relationship between the Mafia and politics. According to him, Riina "personally told me more than once that it is not possible for a politician, at any level, to become a man of honour. It is not even possible for a man of honour to start a political career. On the basis of this rule, which was expressed to me in categorical terms, there is a substantial contempt on the part of Cosa Nostra towards politicians, who are not regarded as serious enough to become part of the organisation."

"We obviously give votes to politicians of our choice and after making an agreement with them, but they have to do what we say, otherwise we break their horns", he said. "Politicians' behaviour might sometimes give rise to 'disappointments,' but their function was particularly important for Cosa Nostra and, hence, there was an 'obligation' for all men of honour to vote for the Christian Democrats."

Notes

References
 (Review )

1954 births
Living people
People from San Giuseppe Jato
Gangsters from the Province of Palermo
Sicilian mafiosi sentenced to life imprisonment
Pentiti